The list of shipwrecks in 1892 includes ships sunk, foundered, grounded, or otherwise lost during 1892.

January

5 January

6 January

8 January

25 January

29 January

February

1 February

7 February

13 February

19 February

21 February

Unknown date

March

8 March

8 March

20 March

Unknown date

April

12 April

20 April

May

3 May

5 May

17 May

18 May

27 May

June

11 June

12 June

22 June

27 June

July

1 July

14 July

23 July

25 July

Unknown date

August

6 August

8 August

20 August

30 August

31 August

September

8 September

17 September

October

1 October

6 October

9 October

18 October

26 October

28 October

28–29 October

November

2 November

8 November

17 November

18 November

24 November

27 November

30 November

Unknown date

December

7 December

9 December

11 December

18 December

20 December

28 December

Unknown date

Citations

References
Colley, Paul (2013) Diving and Snorkelling Ascension Island: Guide to a Marine Life Paradise (Dived Up). 

1892